Olympus Partners is a private equity firm founded in 1988 to make equity investments in middle market leveraged buyouts and growth capital financings.  Although the firm invests in a wide array of industries, over time it has developed deep knowledge and experience in the following sectors: 
 Business services
 Logistics and transportation services
 Healthcare manufacturing and services
 Financial services
 Consumer and restaurants
 Industrial and packaging

The firm is headquartered in Stamford, Connecticut with approximately 20 employees.  Among the firm's most notable current and prior investments are Pregis, IXS, Amspec, Foodware Group, Ennis-Flint, Vaco, PSAV, Tank Holding Corp., Centerplate, Churchill Financial, National Pizza Corporation, Phoenix Services, The Waddington Group, Ann's House of Nuts, Ariel Re, Entrust, K-MAC Enterprises, Symmetry Medical, and TravelCenters of America.  Since its inception, Olympus has made primary investments in over 84 companies and has completed over 114 add-on acquisitions.

History
Olympus Partners was founded in 1988 and has eight General Partners. The General Partners average over 22 years of experience at Olympus, and over 26 years of experience within private equity.

Since its inception in 1988, Olympus has raised seven institutional private equity funds, with total investor commitments of approximately $8.5 billion:

1990 - Olympus Private Placement Fund - $101 million
1994 – Olympus Growth Fund II - $268 million
1998 – Olympus Growth Fund III - $505 million
2003 – Olympus Growth Fund IV - $758 million
2007 – Olympus Growth Fund V - $1.53 billion
2013 – Olympus Growth Fund VI - $2.3 billion
2017 – Olympus Growth Fund VII - $3.0 billion

Olympus is also well known for its blog on investments in private equity.

Performance
Olympus Partners has been recognized by Preqin Ltd., a provider of alternative asset research and data, as one of the most consistent Private Equity managers in the world, with four of its five fully invested buyout funds ranked in the top quartile.

Robert S. Morris
Robert S. Morris is an American private equity business executive who is the founder and Managing Partner of Olympus Partners. Prior to founding Olympus in 1988, he worked in various executive positions for General Electric in manufacturing, financial services, and for GE's Pension Fund.

Education
Morris graduated from Hamilton College with an AB in 1976. At Hamilton, he hosted a weekly comedy sketch program in the College Chapel.  He received his M.B.A. degree from the Amos Tuck School at Dartmouth College in 1980.

Career
Morris began his career in Holland, Michigan on the Financial Management Program for General Electric's Hermetic Motor Department. He left GE in 1978 to earn his MBA at Dartmouth. He returned to GE's Metallurgical Division in Columbus, OH in a financial analyst role. In 1981, he moved to Stamford, CT to become Manager of Financial Analysis of GE's commercial Real Estate Business and in 1983 he founded the private equity department for the GE Pension Fund. As Senior Vice President of GEIC, the Pension Fund Manager, he grew the asset value to $1.6 Billion before founding Olympus Partners in September 1988. The first Olympus Fund, The Olympus Private Placement Fund, of $101 MM, was raised amidst the strong investor backlash over the RJR Nabisco buyout and the Drexel Burnham bankruptcy.  Since 1988, Olympus has now raised over $8.5 Billion in Institutional Funds. Morris has served as Chairman of the Board of dozens of Olympus portfolio companies. He is also the author of the well-known humorous private equity blog featured on the Olympus website.

Personal
Morris is a trustee of Hamilton College. He is former Chairman and continues as a trustee of the Waterside School, an inner city independent school in Stamford, CT.  He is deeply involved in designing and funding research for regenerative medicine.  He has actively advised and funded young neurological disease management companies.  For the past two decades, he has taught private equity courses at the Tuck School and before that at the Stanford Graduate School of Business. He is the author of the travelog “Don’t Lean out the Window”.

References

External links
 
 Recent Olympus News

Private equity firms of the United States
Financial services companies established in 1988
Companies based in Stamford, Connecticut